Gandhi, Fighter Without a Sword  is a biography of Mohandas Karamchand Gandhi written for children by Jeanette Eaton. It is illustrated by Ralph Ray. The biography was first published in 1950 and was a Newbery Honor recipient in 1951.

References

External links

 

1950 children's books
Children's history books
American children's books
Newbery Honor-winning works
Books about Mahatma Gandhi